The Keiser Water Tower is a historic waterworks facility at Water and East Main Street in Keiser, Arkansas.  It is an open metal structure, several stories high, with a roughly cylindrical tank at the top, and a rising through the center to provide water to the tank.  A ladder providing access to the tank is fixed to one of the legs, and there is a circular catwalk with railing around the tank.  The structure was built in 1936 with funding from the Public Works Administration, and is one of the few Depression-era structures left in the small community.

The water tower was listed on the National Register of Historic Places in 2007.

See also
National Register of Historic Places listings in Mississippi County, Arkansas

References

Towers completed in 1936
Water towers on the National Register of Historic Places in Arkansas
Public Works Administration in Arkansas
National Register of Historic Places in Mississippi County, Arkansas
1936 establishments in Arkansas